Prince William Henry, Duke of Gloucester and Edinburgh,  (25 November 1743 – 25 August 1805), was a grandson of King George II and a younger brother of George III of the United Kingdom.

Life

Youth

Prince William Henry was born at Leicester House, Westminster. His parents were Frederick, Prince of Wales, eldest son of George II and Caroline of Ansbach, and Princess Augusta of Saxe-Gotha, then Princess of Wales. He was baptized at Leicester House eleven days later. His godparents were his paternal uncle by marriage, the Prince of Orange; his paternal uncle, the Duke of Cumberland; and his paternal aunt (via a proxy marriage), Princess Amelia. He was fourth in the line of succession at birth.

His father died in 1751, leaving the Prince's elder brother, Prince George, heir-apparent to the throne. He succeeded as George III on 25 October 1760, and created William Duke of Gloucester and Edinburgh and Earl of Connaught on 19 November 1764. He had been made a Knight of the Garter on 27 May 1762, and invested on 22 September of that year. In 1764 he began to court Maria Walpole, the Dowager Countess of Waldegrave, an illegitimate granddaughter of Sir Robert Walpole.

Career and marriage

He initially wished for active service in the military, but his health and intelligence both proved insufficient. Instead he was appointed colonel of the 13th Regiment of Foot in 1766. That same year he and Maria married in secret in his home on Pall Mall. This marriage only became known to the King after the passing of the Royal Marriages Act 1772. The Duke and Maria lived at St Leonard's Hill in Clewer, near Windsor and had three children, all of whom were styled Highness from birth and used the territorial designation of Gloucester in conjunction with their princely styles, as great-grandchildren in the male line of George II.

In 1767 he was promoted to major-general and made colonel of the 3rd Regiment of Foot Guards. The same year he was made Warden of Windsor Forest, gaining the post's official residence at Cranbourne Lodge. In 1768 he employed the renowned violin maker Richard Duke as his official instrument maker; giving him private lodgings in Old Gloucester Street and workshops in Gloucester Place. He was made the thirteenth Chancellor of Trinity College, Dublin in 1771, holding the post until 1805.

The Duke and Maria's first child, Princess Sophia of Gloucester (Sophia Matilda; 29 May 1773 – 29 November 1844), was born in 1773. Princess Caroline of Gloucester (Caroline Augusta Maria; 24 June 1774 – 14 March 1775) followed just over a year later and was christened privately on 22 July 1774 – her godparents were the Duchess of Gloucester (her mother), the Hereditary Duchess of Brunswick-Lüneburg (her paternal aunt) and the Hereditary Duke of Brunswick-Lüneburg (her uncle by marriage). However, Princess Caroline died aged just nine months following a smallpox inoculation, intended to protect her from the disease. The Duke and Maria had a third and final child in 1776, Prince William Frederick (15 January 1776 – 30 November 1834).

With the outbreak of the American War of Independence, the Duke hoped for a field command, but George refused. He made a request to serve in the forces of Frederick II of Prussia during the War of Bavarian Succession (1777–1779) – George consented but Frederick himself turned down the offer. He later transferred to the 1st Regiment of Foot Guards, and he became a field marshal on 18 October 1793. He went on to be General Officer Commanding Northern District in 1796, a command that he held until 1802.

Later life
In 1782 an illegitimate daughter was born to the Duke, Louisa Maria La Coast (6 January 1782 – 10 February 1835), who later married Godfrey Macdonald, 3rd Baron Macdonald. Her mother was the Duke's mistress Lady Almeria Carpenter, a daughter of the first Earl of Tyrconnell.

The Duke died at Gloucester House in London in 1805 and was succeeded as duke by his son William Frederick. He was buried at St George's Chapel, Windsor Castle.

Titles, styles, honours and arms

Titles and styles
25 November 1743 – 19 November 1764: His Royal Highness Prince William
19 November 1764 – 25 August 1805: His Royal Highness The Duke of Gloucester and Edinburgh
His peerages were gazetted on 17 November 1764.

Honours
27 May 1762: Royal Knight of the Garter (KG)
Privy Counsellor (PC)
Royal Fellow of the Royal Society (FRS)

Arms

William was granted use of the arms of the kingdom, differenced by a label argent of five points, the centre bearing a fleur-de-lys azure, the other points each bearing a cross gules.

Ancestors

References

External links
Wikiquotes of Edward Gibbon, for the Duke's remark on The History of the Decline and Fall of the Roman Empire
Royal Berkshire History: Prince William Henry, Duke of Gloucester

 

|-

 

Princes of Great Britain
Princes of the United Kingdom
House of Hanover
British field marshals
Grenadier Guards officers
Scots Guards officers
Somerset Light Infantry officers
101
Peers of Great Britain created by George III
Peers of Ireland created by George III
Knights of the Garter
Members of the Privy Council of Great Britain
People from Westminster
People from Windsor, Berkshire
Chancellors of the University of Dublin
Gloucester, William Henry
Military personnel from London
1743 births
1805 deaths
Children of Frederick, Prince of Wales